Beeragondanahalli  is a village in the southern state of Karnataka, India. It is located in the Nelamangala taluk of Bangalore Rural district.

Demographics 
Beeragondanahalli had population of 239 of which 112 are males while 127 are females as per report released by Census India 2011.

Geography 
The total geographical area of village is 108.74 hectares.

Bus Route from Bengaluru City 
Yeshwantapura  - Nelamangala - Dabaspete

See also 

 Devarahosahalli
 Bengaluru Rural District

References

External links 

Villages in Bangalore Rural district